Tucumán Lawn Tennis Club, or simply Tennis Tucumán, is a sports club from San Miguel de Tucumán, Argentina. Founded in 1915 as a tennis club, Tucumán LT is now mostly known for its rugby union team, registered with the Unión de Rugby de Tucumán and currently playing in the Torneo del Noroeste tournament.

Apart from tennis and rugby, the hosts other activities such as athletics, field hockey, football, gymnastics, golf, paddle tennis, squash and swimming.

History
Tucumán Lawn Tennis Club was founded in San Miguel de Tucumán on 20 May 1915, as a multi-sports club, by English expatriates and young locals. The first sports played at the club were lawn tennis and cricket.

Originally located near Tucumán's Savoy Hotel, the club moved to the Parque 9 de Julio, in 1930. In 1987, 10 more hectares were purchased nearby and most installations, except for the clubhouse, were moved there.

Rugby first appeared at the club in 1961 and is now the sport for which the club is mostly known. in 1973 the club would go on to win its first provincial title.

Titles
Torneo del Noroeste (11): 1973, 1977, 1979, 1980, 1981, 1982, 2008, 2009, 2011 , 2012, 2014.

References

External links
Official website

Argentine rugby union teams
Sport in San Miguel de Tucumán
Rugby clubs established in 1915
Tennis in Argentina
1915 establishments in Argentina